Silvius or Sylvius may refer to:

In fiction and mythology
 Alba Silvius, a Roman mythology king
 Aeneas Silvius, a mythological king
 Latinus Silvius, a mythological king
 Romulus Silvius, a mythological king
 Silvius (fictional character), a minor character in the pastoral comedy As You Like It
 Silvius (mythology), a king of Alba in Roman mythology
 Silvius Brabo, a mythical Roman soldier
 Tiberinus Silvius, a mythological king

People (real)
 Sylvius of Toulouse (4th century), Gallo-Roman bishop of Toulouse and saint
 Francis Sylvius (1581-1649), Flemish Catholic theologian
 Franciscus Sylvius (1614-1672), Dutch scientist and physician
 Jacobus Sylvius (1478–1555), French anatomist
 Johan Sylvius (1620–1695), Swedish painter
 Sylvius Leopold Weiss (1687–1750), German composer and lutenist
 Silvius Condpan (d. 2011), Indian National Congress politician
 Silvius Magnago (1914–2010), retired Italian politician

Other uses
 Silvius (fly), a genus of horsefly

Masculine given names